This is a list of songs written by Smokey Robinson.

Chart hits and other notable songs written by Smokey Robinson

References

Robinson, Smokey
American rhythm and blues songs